Marcus Velado-Tsegaye (born 1 July 2001) is a professional soccer player who plays as a forward.

Club career

Early career
Velado-Tsegaye began playing soccer at age five with Edmonton club Xtreme FC. He later played for Edmonton Drillers and Edmonton Victoria.

FC Edmonton
Velado-Tsegaye joined the academy programme of local professional club FC Edmonton in 2016. In 2018, he won the EDSA Premier Division double with the academy and scored eleven goals, finishing third among the league's top scorers.

On 15 February 2019, Velado-Tsegaye signed his first professional contract with Edmonton ahead of the side's inaugural season in the Canadian Premier League. On 18 May 2019, he made his professional debut as a substitute in the Al Classico derby against Cavalry FC. Velado-Tsegaye scored his first professional goal on 1 July against the HFX Wanderers. On 18 November 2020 FC Edmonton announced they had re-signed Velado-Tsegaye ahead of the 2021 Canadian Premier League season. On 9 February 2022, the club announced that Velado-Tsegaye and all but two other players would not be returning for the 2022 season.

International career
In December 2015, Velado-Tsegaye participated in a Canadian under-14 identification camp in Vaughan.

In October 2020, in an interview with El Salvador scout Hugo Alvarado, he mentioned that the team was in contact with Velado-Tsegaye. In December 2020 he was called up to El Salvador's U-20 team and made his debut on 14 December against Nicaragua.

Personal life
Velado-Tsegaye was born and raised in Edmonton to an Ethiopian / Eritrean father and a Salvadorian mother.

References

External links

2001 births
Living people
Association football forwards
Soccer players from Edmonton
Salvadoran footballers
El Salvador youth international footballers
Canadian soccer players
Canadian people of Ethiopian descent
Canadian people of Salvadoran descent
Salvadoran people of Ethiopian descent
FC Edmonton players
Canadian Premier League players